The Twiggs County School District is a public school district in Twiggs County, Georgia, United States, based in Jeffersonville. It serves the communities of Allentown, Danville, and Jeffersonville.

Schools
The Twiggs County School District has one elementary school, one middle school, and one high school.

Elementary school
Jeffersonville Elementary

Middle school
Twiggs Middle School

High school
Twiggs County High School

References

External links

School districts in Georgia (U.S. state)
Education in Twiggs County, Georgia